A fire lookout (partly also called a fire watcher) is a person assigned the duty to look for fire from atop a building known as a fire lookout tower.  These towers are used in remote areas, normally on mountain tops with high elevation and a good view of the surrounding terrain, to spot smoke caused by a wildfire.

Once a possible fire is spotted, "Smoke Reports", or "Lookout Shots" are relayed to the local Emergency Communications Center (ECC), often by radio or phone. A fire lookout can use a device known as an Osborne Fire Finder to obtain the radial in degrees off the tower, and the estimated distance from the tower to the fire.

Part of the lookout's duties include taking weather readings and reporting the findings to the Emergency Communications Center throughout the day.  Often several lookouts will overlap in coverage areas and each will “cross” the same smoke, allowing the ECC to use triangulation from the radials to achieve an accurate location of the fire.

Once ground crews and fire suppression aircraft are active in fire suppression, the lookout personnel continue to search for new smoke plumes which may indicate spotting and alterations that pose risks to ground crews.

Working in a fire lookout tower in the middle of a wilderness area takes a hardy type of person, one who can work with no supervision, and is able to survive without any other human interaction. Some towers are accessible by automobile, but others are so remote a lookout must hike in, or be lifted in by helicopter. In many locations, even modern fire lookout towers do not have electricity or running water.

Most fire lookout jobs are seasonal through the fire season.  Fire lookouts can be paid staff or volunteer staff.  Some volunteer organizations in the United States have started to rebuild, restore and operate aging fire lookout towers.

Although it was considered as “man’s work” in the U.S., women have been doing the job almost from its beginnings.

Countries/Regions that use fire lookouts

United States
Canada (B.C., Alberta, Saskatchewan, Manitoba, Ontario, Nova Scotia)  
Mexico
Uruguay
Brazil
Greece
Australia
New Zealand
Hong Kong
Indonesia
France
Italy
Portugal
Cyprus
Spain
Germany
Latvia
Lithuania
United Kingdom - during World War II (termed 'Fire Watchers') as part of Air Raid Precautions system.
Israel
Russia
Kazakhstan
South Africa
Poland

Notable fire lookouts
 Hallie Morse Daggett – the first female fire lookout for the U.S. Forest Service
 Helen Dowe – Devil's Head Lookout at Pike National Forest (1918)
 Ramona Merwin and family – Vetter Mountain, raised her family in the lookout
 Howard "Razz" Gardner and Keith V. Johnson "The Lookout Air Raid" a little-known Japanese aircraft attack of Oregon, USA during World War II
 Roy Sullivan, worked as a fire lookout in his early career as a U.S. National Park Ranger, but was best known for having set a world record for surviving seven lightning strikes during his life.
 Jack Kerouac, whose books The Dharma Bums, Desolation Angels and Lonesome Traveler include accounts of his job as a fire lookout on Desolation Peak in the North Cascades during the summer of 1956.
 Edward Abbey, who was a fire lookout at Mt. Harkness (1966; Lassen National Park), Atacosa (1968; Coronado National Forest), North Rim (1969–1971; Grand Canyon National Park), Numa Ridge (1975; Glacier National Park), and Aztec Peak (1977–1979; Tonto National Forest).
 Doug Peacock, who was a fire lookout at Huckleberry and Scalplock in Glacier National Park from 1976 to 1984.
 Gary Snyder, who was a fire lookout at Crater Peak and Sourdough Mountain in the North Cascades.
 Philip Whalen, who was a fire lookout on Sourdough Mountain and Sauk Mountain in the North Cascades.
 Norman Maclean, who chronicled his experience in "USFS 1919: The Ranger, the Cook, and a Hole in the Sky"
 Philip Connors, writer
Thomas William Ah Chow was a Chinese-Australian who lived in the remote Moscow Villa in the 1940s.
 Rachel Lindgren , Jeopardy! champion
Ferdinand Martinů, father of the Czech composer Bohuslav Martinů, was a shoemaker, also worked as the church sexton and town fire watchman in the tower of the St. Jakub Church in Polička, Bohemia. Furthermore, Bohuslav Martinů was born in said tower.
 Margaret Thatcher, worked as a fire lookout in Grantham during the Second World War.

In popular culture 
The 2016 video game Firewatch follows the story of a fire lookout, Henry, in Shoshone National Forest after the Yellowstone fires of 1988.

‘Desolation Angels’, a semi-autobiographical novel by Jack Kerouac published in 1965, the opening section of which is taken almost directly from the journal Kerouac kept when he was a fire lookout on Desolation Peak in the North Cascade mountains of Washington state.

See also 
 Lookout tree
Fire lookout tower
List of fire lookout towers

Additional information 
National Historic Lookout Register
Former Fire Lookout Register
Forest Fire Lookout Association
California fire lookouts
Lookout Charley, an online photo weblog of a USFS Volunteer Fire Lookout at Vetter Mountain, California

References

External links

 Fire Lookouts (US Forest Service History Pages, Forest History Society)
 Ontario's Fire Tower Lookouts: Preserving their history
 Angeles National Forest Fire Lookout Association (Los Angeles, CA)
 Forest Fire Lookout Association
 Portugal Fire Tower Lookouts- click on the dots to see photos of each tower
 Lookout Vistas
 Fire Tower Lookouts in Australia
  The Fire Towers of New York
 "A Day in the Life of a Fire Lookout" in Marin County, California

Fire prevention
Forestry occupations
Wildfire suppression